The 2016–17 Pacific Tigers men's basketball team represented the University of the Pacific during the 2016–17 NCAA Division I men's basketball season. They played their home games at the Alex G. Spanos Center as members of the West Coast Conference. The Tigers were led by first-year head coach Damon Stoudamire. They finished the season 11–22, 4–14 in WCC play to finish in ninth place. They defeated Pepperdine in the first round of the WCC tournament to advance to the quarterfinals where they lost to Gonzaga.

Previous season 
The Tigers finished the season 8–20, 6–12 in WCC play to finish in a three way tie for seventh place. On December 12, 2015, head coach Ron Verlin was suspended indefinitely amid an NCAA investigation. Assistant coach Mike Burns was named the interim head coach for the remainder of the season. The Tigers also self-imposed a postseason ban for 2016 which included the WCC Tournament.

On March 3, 2016, it was announced that Ron Verlin was no longer employed by the university. Interim coach Mike Burns was also released from his employment with the school.

On March 16, the school announced that Damon Stoudamire would be the new head coach.

Departures

Incoming transfers

Recruiting Class of 2016

Roster

Schedule and results

|-
!colspan=9 style=|Exhibition

|-
!colspan=9 style=| Non-conference regular season

|-
!colspan=9 style=| WCC regular season

|-
!colspan=9 style=| WCC tournament

References

Pacific Tigers men's basketball seasons
Pacific
Pacific
Pacific